Charles Edward Brooks (12 January 1911 – October 1980) was an English professional footballer who played in the Football League for Clapton Orient as a right back.

Career statistics

References 

English footballers
English Football League players

Leyton Orient F.C. players
1911 births
1980 deaths
Association football fullbacks
People from Folkestone
Arsenal F.C. players
Nunhead F.C. players
Folkestone F.C. players
Crystal Palace F.C. players
Clapton Orient F.C. wartime guest players
People from Brabourne